Robert Leslie Suci (April 7, 1939 – December 21, 2015) was an American football player.  He played college football for Michigan State University. He also played professional football in the American Football League for the Houston Oilers in 1962 and the Boston Patriots in 1963. He appeared in 20 AFL games and returned 25 punts for 233 yards (9.3 yds/return) and 17 kickoffs for 360 yards (21.2 yds/return).  In 1963, he led the AFL with 272 interception return yards and two interceptions returned for touchdowns, including a 98-yard return. His 272 interception return yards in 1963 ranks as the ninth best single-season total in NFL history.  He died in 2015 in Grand Blanc, Michigan where he lived.

References

1939 births
2015 deaths
American football defensive backs
Michigan State Spartans football players
Houston Oilers players
Boston Patriots players
Players of American football from Flint, Michigan
People from Grand Blanc, Michigan
American Football League players